This is a list of members of the Western Australian Legislative Assembly between the 1894 elections and the 1897 elections, together known as the Second Parliament.

Notes
  During the term, three Members of Parliament were appointed to the Ministry by Premier John Forrest. Each were therefore required to resign and submit to a ministerial by-election in their own seat, and all were returned unopposed. The three members were Alexander Richardson (De Grey, 17 June 1895), Frederick Henry Piesse (Williams, 18 April 1896) and George Throssell (Northam, 27 January 1897).
  On 18 September 1894, Everard Darlot resigned from the seat of Murchison, and at the resulting by-election on 15 October 1894, Edward Hooley was elected unopposed to fill the vacancy.
  On 4 January 1895, William Paterson resigned from the seat of Murray, and at the resulting by-election on 12 January 1895, William James George was elected to fill the vacancy.
  In April 1895, William Silas Pearse resigned from the seat of North Fremantle, and at the resulting byelection on 22 May 1895, Matthew Moss was elected to fill the vacancy.
  On 4 July 1896, William Marmion died, leaving the seat of Fremantle vacant. At the byelection on 18 July 1896, John Higham was elected to fill the remainder of the term.

Sources
 
 

Members of Western Australian parliaments by term